Duel of the Titans is a 1961 Italian / French film directed by Sergio Corbucci and starring Steve Reeves, Gordon Scott, and Virna Lisi. The film is about twin brothers revolt against tyranny in pre-Roman Italy and then come to a parting of the ways as they lead their people toward the founding of a new city, known as Rome.  This is based on the legend of Romulus and Remus.

Plot
Born of a God and a mortal, two babies are abandoned to a river. Nurtured by a wolf, they are later recovered by a shepherd. Romulus (Reeves) and Remus (Scott) grow up to lead a band of thieves in an effort to eliminate two cruel Kings—Amulias and Nemulias, the King of the Sabines. After 20 years, the two twins are briefly reunited with their mother. Before she dies, she tells her sons that they are destined to be the founders of a great city.

Later after having fallen in love with the daughter of Nemulias, Romulus is unaware of his brother's ambitions as Remus steadily succumbs to the temptations of power and greed. King Tasius pursues the brothers and their followers both to retrieve his daughter as well as avenge the destruction of his city of Alba Longa. Soon, a rift develops between the two siblings leading to a death duel between both sons of the Gods to determine the true founder of Rome.

Cast

Steve Reeves – Romulus
Gordon Scott – Remus
Franco Volpi – Amulias
Virna Lisi – Julia
Andrea Bosic – Faustulus
Laura Solari – Rea Silvia
José Greci – Estia
Massimo Girotti – Tasius Nemulias
Jacques Sernas – Cursias
Ornella Vanoni – Tarpea
Piero Lulli – Sulpicius

Release
Romolo e Remo was released in Italy on 6 December 1961 with a 108-minute running time. It was released in the United States in an 89-minute running time in June 1963.

See also
 List of historical drama films
 List of films set in ancient Rome
 Romulus & Remus: The First King

References

Bibliography

External links

http://videowatchdog.blogspot.com/2007_04_29_archive.html

1961 films
1960s Italian-language films
Films set in ancient Rome
Films based on classical mythology
Films set in the 8th century BC
Films set in Rome
Peplum films
Films directed by Sergio Corbucci
Films with screenplays by Sergio Leone
Films about brothers
Sword and sandal films
Films scored by Piero Piccioni
Cultural depictions of Romulus and Remus
Twins in fiction
Films about twin brothers
1960s Italian films